Ethel Jacks is a former Ghanaian professional tennis player who won three consecutive women's singles titles (1964, 1968, 1974) and three women's doubles  titles (1964, 1968, 1976) at the African Table Tennis Championships. This feat earned her the nickname, Queen of African table tennis. She also competed at the 1961 World Championships.

Born in Accra, Ghana , she represented her father's birth country at the 1976 African Championships.

Awards 
In April 2019, Ethel was awarded by Africa Table Tennis during the ITTF African, Youth, Junior and Cadet Championship held in Ghana for her contribution to the sports from the 1960s through 1970's.

References

Living people
1940s births
Ghanaian female table tennis players